Uropyia is a genus of moths of the family Notodontidae described by Staudinger in 1892.

Species
Uropyia melli Schintlmeister, 2002
Uropyia meticulodina (Oberthür, 1884)
Uropyia pontada (Yang, 1995)

References

Notodontidae